The 2020 Campeonato Paranaense (officially the Campeonato Paranaense de Futebol Profissional da 1ª Divisão - Temporada 2020) was the 106th edition of the top division of football in the state of Paraná organized by FPF. The competition started on 18 January and ended on 5 August.

On 16 March 2020, FPF suspended the Campeonato Paranaense indefinitely due to the COVID-19 pandemic in Brazil. Complying with the guidelines of the Governo do Estado do Paraná, the tournament resumed behind closed doors on 18 July 2020.

Athletico Paranaense, the defending champions, won their 26th title after defeating Coritiba 3–1 on aggregate.

Format
In the first stage, each team played the other eleven teams in a single round-robin tournament. The teams were ranked according to points.

If tied on points, the following criteria would be used to determine the ranking: 1. Wins; 2. Goal difference; 3. Goals scored; 4. Head-to-head results; 5. Fewest red cards; 6. Fewest yellow cards; 7. Draw in the headquarters of the FPF.

Top eight teams advanced to the quarter-finals of the final stages. The bottom two teams were relegated to the second division. Top three teams not already qualified for 2021 Série A, Série B or Série C qualified for 2021 Série D.

Final stage was played on a home-and-away two-legged basis, with the best overall performance team hosting the second leg. If tied on aggregate, the penalty shoot-out would be used to determine the winner. Top four teams qualified for the 2021 Copa do Brasil.

Participating teams

First stage

Final stage

Bracket

Quarter-finals

|}

Group A

Coritiba qualified for the semi-finals.

Group B

FC Cascavel qualified for the semi-finals.

Group C

Athletico Paranaense qualified for the semi-finals.

Group D

Cianorte qualified for the semi-finals.

Notes

Semi-finals

|}

Group E

Coritiba qualified for the finals.

Group F

Athletico Paranaense qualified for the finals.

Finals

|}

Group G

Overall table

Top goalscorers

References

Paranaense
Campeonato Paranaense